Make Your Own History is the fourth studio album by Stray from the Path, released on October 26, 2009, by Sumerian Records. The song "Damien" was released as a single in July 2010.

Reception

Bring On Mixed Reviews stated, "From start to finish, it is a non-stop, blunt, punch to the face. Thankfully though, it is much less dull than other frantic bands out there." The review gave the album a rating of 3.5 out of 5.

Track listing
 "Lucid Dreaming" - 2:12
 "Manipulator" - 2:36
 "Negative and Violent" - 2:56
 "Mitra" - 2:39
 "Damien" - 3:19
 "Fraudulent" - 2:46
 "The Things You Own End Up Owning You" - 2:11
 "Comrades" - 3:17
 "Black Anchor" - 2:19
 "Nigeria" (featuring Jonathan Vigil of The Ghost Inside) - 1:57
 "Make Your Own History" - 2:41

Personnel

Stray from the Path
 Andrew "Drew York" Dijorio – lead vocals
 Tom Williams – guitar
 Justin Manas - guitar
 Ryan Thompson – bass guitar
 Dan Bourke – drums

Production
 Misha "Bulb" Mansoor – producer, engineer
 Mike Rashmawi – engineer
 Tyler Voletz – engineer
 Sons of Nero – artwork

References

2009 albums
Stray from the Path albums
Sumerian Records albums